Frank Bailey (born 1970) is a former aide to then Alaska governor Sarah Palin, and the principal author of Blind Allegiance to Sarah Palin: A Memoir of Our Tumultuous Years. He was involved in the Troopergate scandal that beset Palin during her participation, as the Republican candidate for Vice President, in the 2008 presidential campaign.

Blind Allegiance to Sarah Palin
The book was released in May 2011 by Howard Books, a division of Simon & Schuster. The book was coauthored by Jeanne Devon, editor of the Alaska-based liberal weblog Mudflats, and economist Ken Morris, an author, former trader, and Wall Street critic. The book was prematurely released online in February 2011. The book received coverage in national media outlets, and was described by the Christian Science Monitor as "depict(ing) Palin as ill-prepared, immature, vindictive, and unethical." Howard Books is a Christian publishing imprint of Simon and Schuster. After the books publication, Bailey appeared on TV talk show The View, discussing his observations of Palin.

References

External links
 Blind Allegiance to Sarah Palin at the Canadian Howard Books/Simon & Schuster website
 Ken Morris website
 Blind Allegiance at the Mudflats weblog 

1970 births
American political writers
American male non-fiction writers
Living people
Writers from Alaska